Azhagu Kutti Chellam is a 2016 Indian Tamil-language children's film written and directed by Charles. The film stars child actors Krisha Kurup, Chanakyaa, Yazhini, Rajesh, and Ken Karunas. Akhil and Riythvika play supporting roles while Ved Shankar composes the film's music. Having been in the making since 2013, the film released on 1 January 2016 to highly positive reviews.

Cast

Krisha Kurup as Nila
Chanakyaa as Jayan "Jai"
Yazhini as Jennifer "Jenni"
Rajesh Gunasekar as Dileepan
Ken Karunas as Murugu Subramani
Akhil as Saravanan
Riythvika as Saravanan's wife
Karunas as Auto Driver
Suresh as Church Father
John Vijay as Callsheet Kumar
Thambi Ramaiah as Orphanage owner
Aadukalam Naren as Jayan's father and businessman
Vinodhini as Anandhi, a School Teacher
Meera Krishnan as Brahmin lady 
Kaajal Pasupathi
Chetan as Anandhi's husband
George Vishnu as a brahmin
Narayan as Jennifer's uncle
Mathan Thivagaran
Jeeva Ravi as Akila's father
Tejaswini
Agila
Neha Babu Priya
Nila
Krisha
Simba
Srisha
Metro Priya
V. M. S. Subagunarajan
M. S. Bharani

Production
Produced by Anthony, best known for directing the television chat show Neeya Naana, the team began work on the film in mid 2013. A teaser trailer was revealed on 1 January 2014 and the film's first official poster released on 14 April 2014 coinciding with Tamil New Years Day. After a further delay, the team began promoting the film for a January 2016 release, with actor Sivakarthikeyan, a friend of Anthony, unveiling a new trailer during late December 2015.

Soundtrack

The Music Was composed by Ved Shankar and Released on Think Music India.

Release
The film opened to positive reviews at the box office on 1 January 2016. The satellite rights of the film were sold to STAR Vijay.

Reception
Behindwoods.com labelled it "a genuine attempt made honestly on a very humble budget, and having the right emotions", and added "this low-key effort deserves some support from the audience". The Times of India wrote, "using a multi-strand narrative, debutant director Charles weaves a heart-warming tale with Azhagu Kutti Chellam". Kollytalk.com rated the film 3/5 and wrote "Azhagu Kutti Chellam, in a nutshell, is a sensitive portrayal of the manner in which kids are treated by the society."

References

External links

2016 films
2010s Tamil-language films
2010s children's drama films
Indian children's drama films
Films scored by Ved Shankar